The fifth series of The Only Way Is Essex, a British semi-reality television programme, began airing on 15 April 2012 on ITV2. The series concluded on 27 May 2012 and consisted of ten episodes. A "The Only Way Is Marbs" special aired on 13 June 2012 and is included on the Series 5 DVD. This is the first series to include new cast members Danni Park-Dempsey, Tom Pearce and Joan Collins, who is the mother of Gemma Collins. It is the last series to include Georgina Dorsett, who made her debut during the previous series. The series mainly focused on the bitter fallout between Charlie and Gemma following their break-up and her spreading rumours about his sexuality, as well as the rekindled romance between Joey and Sam, and a new relationships for Tom K and Lydia, Ricky and Jess, and Lauren P and Tom P. It also included a divide between the boys of Essex, and Lucy and Mario getting engaged.

Cast

Episodes

{| class="wikitable plainrowheaders" style="width:100%; background:#fff;"
|-style="color:white"
! style="background:#F6CEEC;"| SeriesNo.
! style="background:#F6CEEC;"| EpisodeNo.
! style="background:#F6CEEC;"| Title
! style="background:#F6CEEC;"| Original airdate
! style="background:#F6CEEC;"| Duration
! style="background:#F6CEEC;"| UK viewers

|}

Reception

Ratings

References

The Only Way Is Essex
2012 in British television
2012 British television seasons